"Say a Prayer for Me" is a song by Australian alternative dance group RÜFÜS. The song was released on 13 January 2016 as the fourth single from the group's second studio album, Bloom (2016). The song peaked at number 58 on the ARIA Chart. The song was certified gold in Australia in 2017.

Reception
Tom Williams from Music Feeds called the song "super chill" saying "[it] packs some crisp grooves, layered vocals and warm synths, as well as those summery RÜFÜS vibes."

Music video
The music video was directed by Toby + Pete and released on 28 January 2016. Ryan Middleton of Music Times said "The video is shot deep in woods with the three of them playing their respective instruments to the smallest crowd they will see all year. They bring their own big production along with a big laser display installed above them that walls them into one enclosed space with more lights and fog on the ground shining on them as they play."

Track listing

Charts

Certifications

Release history

References

2015 songs
2016 singles
Rüfüs Du Sol songs